This is a list of aircraft carriers of the Second World War.

Aircraft carriers serve as a seagoing airbases, equipped with a flight deck and facilities for carrying, arming, deploying and recovering aircraft. Typically, they are the capital ships of a fleet, as they project air power worldwide without depending on local bases for operational support. Aircraft carriers are expensive and are considered critical assets. By the Second World War aircraft carriers had evolved from converted cruisers, to purpose built vessels of many classes and roles. Fleet carriers were the largest type, operating with the main fleet to provided offensive capability. Light aircraft carriers were fast enough to operate with the fleet but smaller and with fewer aircraft.

Escort carriers were smaller and slower, with low numbers of aircraft, and provided defense for convoys. Most of the latter were built from mercantile hulls or, in the case of merchant aircraft carriers, were bulk cargo ships with a flight deck added on top. Catapult aircraft merchant ships, were cargo-carrying merchant ships that could launch (but not retrieve) a single fighter aircraft from a catapult to defend the convoy from long-range German aircraft.

The aircraft carrier dramatically changed naval combat in the war, as air power became a significant factor in warfare. The advent of aircraft as primary weapons was driven by the superior range, flexibility and effectiveness of carrier-launched aircraft. They had higher range and precision than naval guns, making them highly effective. The versatility of the carrier was demonstrated in November 1940 when  launched a long-range strike on the Italian fleet at their base in Taranto, signalling the beginning of effective and highly mobile aircraft strikes. This operation incapacitated three of the six battleships at a cost of two torpedo bombers.

In the Pacific Ocean clashes occurred between aircraft carrier fleets. The 1941 Japanese surprise attack on Pearl Harbor was a clear illustration of the power projection capability afforded by a large force of modern carriers. Concentrating six carriers in a single unit turned naval history about, as no other nation had fielded anything comparable.

This new-found importance of naval aviation forced nations to create a number of carriers, in an effort to provide air superiority for every major fleet. This extensive usage required the construction of several new 'light' carriers. Although with complements similar to escort carriers, they had the advantage of speed from their converted cruiser hulls. The British 1942 Design Light Fleet Carrier was designed for quick construction by civilian shipyards and a short three-year service life. They served the Royal Navy during the war, and their hull design was chosen for nearly all aircraft carrier equipped navies after the war until the 1980s. Emergency situations during the war spurred the creation of highly unconventional aircraft carriers, such as the CAM ships.

The List of ships of World War II contains major military vessels of the war, arranged alphabetically and by type. The list includes armed vessels that served during the war and in the immediate aftermath, inclusive of localized ongoing combat operations, garrison surrenders, post-surrender occupation, colony re-occupation, troop and prisoner repatriation, to the end of 1945. For smaller vessels, see also List of World War II ships of less than 1000 tons. Some uncompleted Axis ships are included, out of historic interest. Ships are designated to the country under which they operated for the longest period of World War II, regardless of where they were built or previous service history.

List of ships

References

Bibliography 
 
 
 
 
 
  
 
  
 
 
 
 
 
 

 
Aircraft carriers
World War II